James Riabhach Darcy was Mayor of Galway in Ireland 1602–1603.

Life
Darcy was a member of the Tribes of Galway, and the first of his family to become Mayor. The family originally humble farmers from Pártraí, County Mayo, who moved to Galway in the 1480s. 
Darcy's ancestor, Walter Riabhac Ó Dorchaidhe (fl. c. 1488), was of the Partraige of Lough Carra. Walter Riabhach is believed to have settled in Galway sometime in the mid-15th century. Dubhaltach MacFhirbhisigh states that this Walter Riabhach was"the first man of the Uí Dorchaidhe who came to Galway, according to the Galweigians themselves".

Darcy was at one point vice-president of Connacht

By his first marriage to a Miss Bodkin, he fathered Nicholas, Martin, James, Anthony and Anastace. With Elizabeth Martyn he had Andrew and Patrick. Elizabeth Martyn was a granddaughter of William Óge Martyn, and an aunt of Richard Martyn, who would later become brother-in-law and legal partner of Patrick Darcy.

He died towards the end of his term, and was replaced in office by Christopher Lynch, who had been his predecessor. His descendants included Patrick D'Arcy and John Darcy, the founder of Clifden.

References
History of Galway, James Hardiman, 1820
Old Galway, Maureen Donovan O'Sullivan, 1942
  Patrick Darcy, Galway Lawyer and Politician, 1598–1668, Liam O'Malley, in Galway:Town and Gown 1484–1984, ed. Diarmuid Ó Cearbhaill, Dublin, 1984.  
 The Celebrated Antiquary: Dubhaltach Mac Fhirbhisigh (c.1600–1671) - His Life, Lineage and Learning, An Sagart, Maynooth, Nollaig Ó Muraíle, 1996; reprinted 2003. 
 Henry, William (2002). Role of Honour: The Mayors of Galway City 1485–2001. Galway: Galway City Council.  
 Martyn, Adrian, The Tribes of Galway:1124–1642, Galway, 2016. 

Politicians from County Galway
Mayors of Galway
16th-century Irish businesspeople
17th-century Irish businesspeople